Eustrophus tomentosus is a species of polypore fungus beetle in the family Tetratomidae. It is found in North America.

This species contains characteristic yellowish-orange setae abundant throughout elytra surface.

It is able to be distinguished from Eustrophopsis through the absence of a prothoracic episterna  transverse suture.

References

Further reading

External links

 

Tenebrionoidea
Articles created by Qbugbot
Beetles described in 1827